This list of the tallest buildings in Ramat Gan ranks buildings in Ramat Gan, Israel by their height.

Ramat Gan is a city in the Tel Aviv Metropolitan Area that houses the Diamond Exchange District, one of Israel's largest business areas in terms of floor space. Between 2001 and 2016 it housed Israel's tallest building, Moshe Aviv Tower, at 235 m, surpassed by Tel Aviv's Azrieli Sarona Tower, at 238 m. A secondary entrance of Moshe Aviv Tower lies below the main entrance, making the tower 244 m tall by another metric, still the tallest in Israel as of 2021.

Ramat Gan is also the site of the tallest building in Israel approved for construction – Tower 120, so named after the number of floors it is slated to have.

List

See also
 List of tallest buildings in Israel
 List of tallest buildings in Tel Aviv

References

Ramat Gan
Architecture in Israel
Ramat Gan